KKU or kku may refer to:
 Khon Kaen University, a university in Thailand
 King Khalid University, a public university in Abha, Saudi Arabia
 Kanakpura railway station (Indian Railway station code), a railway station in Rajasthan
 Kuapa Kokoo Farmers' Union, a 1993 Ghanaian cocoa farmers' cooperative organisation
 Kim Gu-yong (1922–2001), pen-name Kim Kku, a South Korean poet and calligrapher
 Ekuk Airport IATA FID, the IATA code for the airport in Ekuk, Alaska
 K. K. University, a university in Bihar, India
 Tumi language (ISO 639 code)